Some parts of the Government of Thailand are selected through democratic elections. These include the House of Representatives of Thailand, (which combines with the appointed Senate of Thailand to create the National Assembly of Thailand), local Administrations, Governorship of Bangkok and national referendums. Thailand has so far had 28 general elections since 1933; the last election was in 2019. Voting in elections in Thailand is compulsory.  All elections in Thailand are regulated by the Election Commission of Thailand.

Suffrage

Elections are held under universal suffrage in accordance with the 2007 Constitution; however, certain restrictions apply:

The voter must be a national of Thailand; if not by birth, then by being a citizen for 5 years. 
They must be over 18 years old the year before the year the election is held. 
The voter must have also registered ninety days before the election at his constituency. 
Those barred from voting in House elections are: members of the sangha or clergy, those suspended from the privilege (for various reasons), detainees under legal or court orders, and people of unsound mind or of mental infirmity.

Regarding universal suffrage, Thailand (and Siam) has given women right to vote in national election since 1932, and in village election since 1897, which could make Thailand the second country in the world to do so.

Elections

House of Representatives

The House of Representatives consists of 500 members, of which 350 are directly elected through the first past the post system in which each member represents one "constituency". The other 150 is elected through party lists given to the election commission by the political parties before election day. In the current system as laid out by the 2017 constitution, known as "mixed member apportionment (MMA)", the voter casts a single vote for a constituency MP, which is then also used in the calculation of the party list seats. This differs from the previous 2007 constitution, where the vote for constituency MP and party list MP were separate.

Special elections can be called if the candidate fail to pass the commission's standards (known as yellow-cards) or if a vacancy occurs. The commission also have the authority to annul or ban candidates based on their standards (red-cards). The last election for the House occurred in 2019, with a special election being held in Chiang Mai after the winning candidate was disqualified. The House has a term of four years but may be dissolved before that time.

Senate
The current 250 senators of the Senate of Thailand were not elected, but were appointed by the National Council for Peace and Order, the military junta which ruled Thailand from 2014 to the 2019 general election. The 2017 constitution does not include elections for the Senate.

In the previous 2007 constitution, the Senate was composed of 150 members.  Of these, 76 were directly elected, while 74 members were appointed.  Of the elected members, 75 came from the Provinces of Thailand, and one from the Bangkok Metropolitan Area.  The election was based on the first past the post system. The last election for the Senate occurred in 2014.

The Senate is a non-partisan chamber and therefore candidates cannot be a member of a political party. Terms are fixed at six years.

Local Administration

There are three different levels of municipalities, which all elect their own municipal council and mayor. The municipalities are split into constituencies, which each elect six councillors. The number of constituencies depends on the municipal level.
 thesaban nakhon (city): 4 constituencies, 24 councillors.
 thesaban mueang (town): 3 constituencies, 18 councillors.
 thesaban tambon (subdistrict municipality): 2 constituencies, 12 councillors.
The Tambon Administrative Organizations, a local government similar to the municipalities, also has an elected council and mayor. Every administrative village within the TAO sends two councillors to the council, only if there are less than three villages the number of councillors per villages is increased to reach the minimum size of six councillors. Pattaya as a special administrative area has a council with 24 seats and an elected mayor, same as a city.

Additionally, every province has a province-wide local government named Provincial Administrative Organization with an elected council and chairman. The size of the council depends on the population of the province.

For all the local governments, the electoral term is four years. If a councillor positions becomes vacant, a by-election is held in the corresponding constituency, if a mayor position becomes vacant, a new election for a four-year term is held. Thus elections for mayor and council aren't necessarily on the same date.

City of Bangkok

Councils

Bangkok is divided into 50 local district councils, one for every district. The size of these councils differ between 7 and 8. Additionally, there are 61 seats in the Bangkok Metropolitan Council (BMC). The election follow a four-year cycle. The most recent local election was in 2022.

Gubernatorial

The Governor of Bangkok is the only elected Governor in the country. The Governor holds a four-year renewable term. The election does not coincide with that of the district councils or the BMC. The most recent election for Governor of Bangkok was in 2022.

Referendums

There has only been two constitutional referendums, in 2007 and 2016.

Issues
There have been many issues especially in recent years concerning elections in Thailand. Accusations of vote buying and blackmail have been most cited. Most accusations leveled concern vote buying, particularly in rural areas where representatives of political parties or district captains are sent out offering up to 2,000 Baht for a vote. Others concern cheating and ballot tampering.

Other issues concern the powers of the Election Commission, an unelected and unaccountable body of five, which has absolute authority to cancel elections at will. It is also the sole arbiter and interpreter of Thai election laws. It has been incredibly active in the last two general elections in annulling and disqualifying candidates.

Voter turnout during elections is not much of a problem in Thailand as voting is compulsory and is one of the responsibilities described in the Constitution a citizen must exercise. Turnout is however much higher during general elections (85% in 2007, 75% in 2019) than they are for Senate (56% in 2008, 43% in 2014) or local elections (54% for Bangkok Governor in 2008).

List of House of Representatives general elections

20st century

21st century

List of Senate regular elections

21st century 
2000 Thai Senate election
2006 Thai Senate election
2008 Thai Senate election
2014 Thai Senate election

See also
 Electoral calendar
 Electoral system

References

External links
Adam Carr's Election Archive
Thailand Electoral Commission
Thailand at the Consortium for Elections and Political Process Strengthening (CEPPS)